Kazanlytamak (Qaźanlıtamaq) is a rural locality (a village) in Donskoy Selsoviet, Belebeyevsky District, Bashkortostan, Russia. The population was 133 as of 2010. There is 1 street.

Geography 
Kazanlytamak is located 24 km east of Belebey (the district's administrative centre) by road. Mezhdugornoye is the nearest rural locality.

References 

Rural localities in Belebeyevsky District